Argentina at the 1908 Summer Olympics in London, England was the nation's second appearance out of four editions of the Summer Olympic Games. Argentina did not participate at the 1896 Summer Olympics and 1904 Summer Olympics. Horatio Torromé has the distinction of being Argentina's second one-man national representative, and debut Olympian in the Olympic sporting event of figure skating, ranking overall seventh. A one athlete team from Argentina competed at the 1900 Summer Olympics.

Results by event

Figure skating

Sources
 
 

Nations at the 1908 Summer Olympics
1908
Olympics